The Volksempfänger ("people's receiver") was a range of German radio receivers developed by engineer Otto Griessing at the request of Joseph Goebbels, the Reich Minister of Propaganda of the Nazi regime.

The purpose of the Volksempfänger program was to make radio reception technology affordable to the general public. Goebbels realized the great propaganda potential of this relatively new medium and thus considered widespread availability of receivers highly important.

History 

The original Volksempfänger VE301 model was presented on August 18, 1933, at the 10. Große Deutsche Funkausstellung in Berlin.

The Volksempfänger was designed to be produced as cheaply as possible; as a consequence they generally lacked shortwave bands and did not follow the practice, common at the time, of marking the approximate dial positions of major European stations on its tuning scale. Only German and (after the 1938 annexation) Austrian stations were marked, and cheaper models only listed arbitrary numbers. Sensitivity to receive weak signals was limited, to reduce production costs further; so long as the set could receive Deutschlandsender and the local Reichssender, it was considered sensitive enough. However, foreign stations could be received after dark with an external antenna, particularly as stations such as the BBC European service increased their transmission power over the course of the war.

Listening to foreign stations became a criminal offence in Nazi Germany when the war began, while in some occupied territories, such as Poland, all radio listening by non-German citizens was outlawed (later in the war this prohibition was extended to a few other occupied countries coupled with mass seizures of radio sets). Penalties ranged from fines and confiscation of radios to, particularly later in the war, sentencing to a concentration camp or capital punishment. Nevertheless, such clandestine listening was widespread in many Nazi-occupied countries and (particularly later in the war) in Germany itself. The Germans also attempted radio jamming of some enemy stations with limited success.

Technical details 

First introduced in 1933, the Volksempfänger Model VE301 used a regenerative circuit, an economical radio receiver design common during the 1920s. Three different VE301 models were produced to suit differing power supply requirements: batteries, alternating current (AC) mains, or direct current (DC) mains. Variations in AC line voltages were accommodated by moving a wire on the power transformer to select 110 volt, 130 volt, or 220 volt power sources. The set employed two or three vacuum tubes, depending on what kind of power source the radio was designed to operate from: the REN904/AF7 as the RF regenerative circuit, the RES 164 as the audio amplifier and the RGN354 rectifier for receivers designed to run on AC power. 

The radio set was capable of reception on two bands: Langwelle (long wave) from 150 to 350 kilohertz, and Mittelwelle (medium wave) from 550 to 1700 kilohertz. On later models, the glass tuning dial was imprinted with the names of German and Austrian cities corresponding to the frequencies of broadcast stations located in them. Three antenna jacks were provided for antennas of differing lengths, used to optimize reception on the different frequency bands. 

Volksempfänger models produced between 1933 and 1937 used an inexpensive metal reed type speaker. The 1938 models (VE301 Dyn) added an audio output transformer and featured a more modern electrodynamic loudspeaker.

Legacy
The legacy of the Volksempfänger as a tool of propaganda is significant. Historian Oliver Rathkolb called it a "vital element of success" in spreading the Nazi ideology "which could not be ignored by the majority of the German population". According to media historian Alexander Badenoch, "Hitler's voice through the Volksempfänger is both a German and a Hollywood cliche for the intrusion of the 'distant' Nazi state into the (otherwise innocent) domestic sphere..." Today, historical exhibitions often use it as a "visual shorthand for Nazi propaganda". 

Under the slogan "every national comrade a radio listener", Minister of Propaganda Joseph Goebbels' intention with the Volksempfänger was to double the number of radio listeners. Hitler's architect and Minister for Armaments and War Production, Albert Speer, said in his final speech at the Nuremberg trials:

Utility receiver
The Volksempfänger "people's radio" concept has been compared to the Utility Radio or "Civilian Receiver" produced by Britain between 1944 and 1945. Unlike the Volksempfänger, the Utility Radio was produced primarily to remedy a shortage of consumer radio sets caused by the British radio industry's switch from civilian to military radio production. These Utility Radios followed a standardized and government approved design, and were built by a consortium of manufacturers using standard components.

RFT "Kolibri"
During the 1950s in East Germany a similar model of radio receiver was produced under the RFT/Stern brand called the "Kolibri" (EN: "Hummingbird") which sold for 50 Marks and was very similar in cabinet styling to the Volksempfänger. A feature of the Kolibri design often misattributed to the Volksempfänger was that it was only designed to receive two (pre-tuned) stations. Sets without such limitations were also produced by RFT but were more expensive.

Polish Ludowy Radios
In 1946 a small number of DKE38 and VE-301 "Ludowy" (People's) receivers were produced at the formerly German held radio factory in Dzierżoniów, Poland. These were produced from materials leftover after the war and were similar to the Volksempfänger (with the Eagle/Swastika badge removed). Production of the sets ended when the stock of components were exhausted and the factory shifted to producing Polish designed sets.

In popular culture
The album Radio-Activity, released in 1975, by German electronic music pioneers Kraftwerk prominently features a Volksempfänger, of the DKE brand (model 38), on its cover.
German band Welle: Erdball has also produced a song entitled "Volksempfänger VE-301", which first appeared on their Die Wunderwelt der Technik album of 2002.
While living in Berlin in the 1970s, the American artist Edward Kienholz produced a series of works entitled Volksempfänger using the old radios, which at the time could be purchased cheaply at Berlin flea markets, a consequence of the large numbers that had been produced in the pre-war years.

See also

 Censorship
 Freedom of information
 Propaganda
 All American Five
 Volksflugzeug
 Linjesender

Notes

Citations

General sources

External links

 Volksempfänger schematics, various models
 Radiomuseum Fürth
 Antique Radio
 Transdiffusion Radiomusications "Hitler's Radio"
 Volksempfängers, various models, pictures "VE 301, DKE38, DAF 1011"
 Gray and Black Radio Propaganda against Nazi Germany Extensively illustrated paper describes the Volksempfänger in the context of British attempts to penetrate Germany's airwaves.

1933 in Germany
Broadcasting in Germany
German inventions of the Nazi period
Joseph Goebbels
Nazi propaganda
Products introduced in 1933
Radio during World War II
Radio in Germany
Types of radios
World War II German electronics